The Icelandic Modern Media Initiative was a parliamentary resolution which was unanimously adopted by the Icelandic Parliament 16 June 2010. It aimed to make Iceland a journalistic safe haven, protecting both freedom of expression as well as freedom of information.

To be provided safe haven under Themis, the server must be located in Iceland. According to Julian Assange in 2010, to operate one of WikiLeaks servers for a year costs € 200,000.

See also 
 International Modern Media Institute
 WikiLeaks

References

External links 
 https://rsf.org/en/news/new-legislation-provide-exemplary-protection-freedom-information

Politics of Iceland